The 2016 Savannah State Tigers football team represented Savannah State University in the 2016 NCAA Division I FCS football season. The Tigers were members of the Mid-Eastern Athletic Conference (MEAC). They were led by first-year head coach Erik Raeburn and played their home games at Ted Wright Stadium. They finished the season 7-4, 6-2 in MEAC play to finish in a three way tie for seventh place.

Schedule

The game between Savannah State and Morgan State was postponed in advance of the arrival of Hurricane Matthew. The game was rescheduled for November 26 on October 7, 2016.
Source: Schedule

References

Savannah State
Savannah State Tigers football seasons
Savannah State Tigers football